Street name may refer to:
the literal meaning of street name, i. e. the name of a street
Street name securities
a name for a recreational drug in drug slang
more generally, a slang term
a synonym for a moniker